Robert Ian Viner AO (born 21 January 1933) is an Australian solicitor and barrister, and former politician.  He was the Liberal member for the House of Representatives seat of Stirling from 1972 until his defeat by Labor's Ron Edwards in the 1983 election. He was Minister for Aboriginal Affairs from 1975 to 1978, Minister for Employment and Youth Affairs from 1978 to 1981—he was a cabinet minister from November 1980.  In 1981, he was appointed Minister for Industrial Relations and, in April 1982, Minister for Defence Support and Minister Assisting the Minister for Defence and a member of the Defence Council.

Sporting
Viner is a former first-grade hockey player in Perth competitions. He has also represented Western Australia and Australia in veterans' hockey. He was captain of the first Australian Masters international touring team (1989–1990).

Honours
He was appointed an Officer of the Order of Australia in the Queen's Birthday Honours in June 1999.

Notes

Liberal Party of Australia members of the Parliament of Australia
Members of the Australian House of Representatives for Stirling
Members of the Australian House of Representatives
Leaders of the Australian House of Representatives
Members of the Cabinet of Australia
Officers of the Order of Australia
1933 births
Living people
20th-century Australian politicians